Robert Richard Armstrong (April 7, 1931 – November 6, 1990) was a Canadian professional ice hockey defenceman. He played in the National Hockey League with the Boston Bruins between 1951 and 1961.

Career
Armstrong played junior hockey with the Stratford Kroehlers and broke into the NHL with the Boston Bruins in the 1950–51 season. Armstrong was known as a hard-hitting defenceman and could be found on the Boston blueline for every one of his 542 career NHL games. He was involved in many fights and made it to the Stanley Cup Finals three times, in 1953, 1957 and 1958. His team never won, however, losing each time to the Montreal Canadiens.

He went on to be a master at Lakefield College School and died on November 6, 1990.

Career statistics

Regular season and playoffs

Awards and achievements
Played in NHL All-Star Game (1960)

See also
List of NHL players who spent their entire career with one franchise

External links
Bob Armstrong at Legends of Hockey

1931 births
1990 deaths
Boston Bruins players
Canadian ice hockey defencemen
Hershey Bears players
Hull-Ottawa Canadiens players
Rochester Americans players
Springfield Indians players
Ice hockey people from Toronto
Stratford Kroehlers players